2019 OK is a near-Earth asteroid noted for its sudden, surprise discovery on the day before its close flyby in 2019. It is uncommon for asteroids of this moderately large size to pass within  of Earth.

Discovery 
The full moon on 16 July 2019 slowed down the asteroid discovery rate during mid-July. The asteroid was detected by Cristóvão Jacques, Eduardo Pimentel and João Ribeiro at the private SONEAR Observatory in Oliveira, Minas Gerais when it was very close to opposition (opposite the Sun in the sky) with a solar elongation of 170 degrees. About 10 hours later it was independently detected by ASAS-SN project in images from two of its telescopes, which allowed a preliminary determination of its orbit. It was subsequently listed on the Minor Planet Center's Near-Earth Object Confirmation Page (NEOCP) as S511618. The listing was confirmed and publicly announced as 2019 OK with three hours remaining before the 25 July 2019 closest approach.

Various circumstances prevented an earlier discovery, despite the efforts to continuously hunt for such objects. The earlier appearance was not lost in the glare of the Sun, but was not favorable to survey instruments located in the Northern Hemisphere, due to its celestial direction in the constellation Capricornus and the bright moon. Automatic analysis missed detecting the object in the Pan-STARRS image because the object was too faint. The Pan-STARRS1 telescope again saw the object on 7 July 2019 when the object was brighter with magnitude 21.2. However, because it was at that time moving directly towards the observer, its apparent motion was extremely slow, with a rate of 0.01 degrees/day, and it was not recognized as a moving object.

Orbit and classification 
The asteroid is a member of the Flora family, a populous asteroid family and the largest family of stony asteroids in the main-belt. It orbits the Sun in the inner main-belt at a distance of 0.5–3.4 AU once every 2 years and 9 months (993 days; semi-major axis of 1.95 AU). Its orbit has an eccentricity of 0.76 and an inclination of 1° with respect to the ecliptic. After evaluating its orbit, the asteroid was identified as the most probable parent body of the particles responsible for the meteor shower designated, 17 Capricornids (SCP #1042).

2019 flyby
On 25 July 2019 at 01:22 UTC it had its closest approach to Earth, when it passed about —less than one-fifth of the distance to the Moon.

Close flybys of larger asteroids

Asteroids in the  Chelyabinsk meteor size range to  Tunguska size range (absolute magnitude H ~26–24) approach closer than the Moon about once per month. Asteroids with an absolute magnitude of 26–24 will vary in size from  depends on the objects albedo (how reflective it is).

Potential impact effects
If 2019 OK had been around the middle of the size estimates it could have released the equivalent explosive energy of about 10 megatons of TNT similar to the 1908 Tunguska event that flattened 2,000 km2 (770 square miles) of forest land. If 2019 OK had been on the smaller size it still could have released over 30 times the energy of the atomic blast by Little Boy at Hiroshima.

Notelist

See also 
2020 LD
Asteroid impact prediction
List of asteroid close approaches to Earth in 2019
List of asteroid close approaches to Earth
List of bolides (asteroids and meteoroids that impacted Earth)

References

External links 
 
  at the IAU Minor Planet Center
 

Minor planet object articles (unnumbered)
20190725
20190725